Henry Carey, 1st Earl of Dover (ca. 158013 April 1666) of Hunsdon, Hertfordshire was an English peer and Member of Parliament.

Life
Carey was the son of John Carey, 3rd Baron Hunsdon. Cambridge University awarded him an honorary MA in 1607. He was knighted, as a Knight of the Bath (KB), on 3 June 1610.

He was elected MP for Sussex in 1609 and Hertfordshire in 1614.

Carey succeeded as 4th Baron Hunsdon on 17 April 1617. On 6 July 1621 he was created Viscount Rochford, a title previously held by his great-great-grandfather Thomas Boleyn, and on 8 March 1628 was created Earl of Dover. He acted as Speaker of the House of Lords in 1641, and was Colonel of the regiment of Oxford Scholars between 1644 and 1646.

In 1638, he sued a London merchant Humphrey Fox for abuse, after Fox had allegedly insulted Dover's livery, worn by a London waterman.

In 1653 he was indicted for counterfeiting coinage and was obliged to sell his Hunsdon estate to William Willoughby, the future 6th Lord Willoughby of Parham

Marriages and issue
Lord Dover married twice. His first marriage, before 1608, was to Judith Pelham, daughter of Sir Thomas Pelham, 1st Baronet. They had four sons and four daughters:
 John Carey, 2nd Earl of Dover
 Sir Pelham Carey
 Henry Carey (died young)
 George Carey (died young)
 Anne Carey
 Mary Carey (1615–1672). Married Thomas Wharton (died 1684)
 Judith Carey (died 1666) Never married.
 Philadelphia Carey

On 6 July 1630 he was married for a second time, to Mary Morris, daughter of Richard Morris and widow of William Cockayne, at the church of St Peter Le Poer in London.

Death
Henry Carey died in 1666, and was buried at Hunsdon in Hertfordshire. He was succeeded by his son from his first marriage, John Carey, 2nd Earl of Dover.

Notes

References 

|-

Births circa 1580
1666 deaths
16th-century English nobility
17th-century English nobility
Henry
Members of the Parliament of England for Hertfordshire
English MPs 1604–1611
English MPs 1614
Knights of the Bath
Earls of Dover
Barons Hunsdon